Dillman may refer to:

People with the surname
August Dillmann (1823–1894), German Orientalist
Grover C. Dillman (1889–1979), American engineer and politician
Bradford Dillman (1930–2018), American actor
George Dillman, creator of Kyusho jitsu
Meredith Dillman, American fantasy artist and illustrator

Places
Dillman, Indiana, an unincorporated community in Wells County
Dillman, Missouri, an unincorporated community